Mesodineutes amurensis is an extinct species of fossil beetle in the family Gyrinidae, the only species in the genus Mesodineutes.

References

†
Fossil taxa described in 1977
†
Prehistoric beetle genera